, there are 65 North Korean-run and pro-North Korean websites blocked in South Korea. A test conducted by OpenNet Initiative in 2010 found that most websites blocked in South Korea are related to North Korea. The number of blocked North Korean sites has increased in recent years.

Blocking is based on the National Security Act, and coordinated by the Korea Communications Standards Commission, which also engages in Internet surveillance. The commission is nominally independent but mainly appointed by the government. The blocks are implemented by Internet service providers (ISPs). South Korean law imposes punishments up to seven years of imprisonment for attempting to access blocked sites. According to Reporters Without Borders, blocking of North Korean websites is not viewed favorably by South Korean Internet users and some know how to circumvent it. Internet Archive's Wayback Machine and web caches of search engines are not blocked and include copies of North Korean websites.

In 2005, up to 3,167 webpages unrelated to North Korea were found to be blocked due to blocking IPs at the router level. DNS tampering that prevents domain names to be resolved into correct IPs is also used.

In addition to entire websites, it is possible to block accounts on social media, and some 13 accounts have been blocked on Facebook, YouTube and Twitter, including Uriminzokkiri's Twitter account. Twitter, however, has proven impractical to censor because retweets of North Korean tweets by other users are not blocked. Furthermore, any links to North Korean websites in the tweets are already blocked. Individual contents of websites hosted in South Korea may also be deleted. In 2010, South Korean website administrators were forced to delete 80,499 pro-North Korea messages.

Blocking has increased from previous years. According to Reporters Without Borders, blocking sharply intensified during Lee Myung-bak's presidency. In OpenNet Initiative's 2006 test, the overwhelming majority of tested North Korean websites were blocked. In 2007 and 2008, a significant number of tested North Korean sites remained blocked and blocking was consistent among Internet service providers.

2014 list
The following North Korea-based or pro-North Korean websites were blocked in South Korea in 2014.

See also

Internet censorship in South Korea
Internet in North Korea
.kp
Kwangmyong network
North Korea Tech

Notes

References

External links

High Impact List (2004–2005) at OpenNet Initiative

Lists of websites
Internet censorship in South Korea
Websites banned in South Korea
South Korea communications-related lists
Banned in South Korea
North Korea